Cacht is an Irish language female given name.

Bearers of the name

 Cacht dercu Corco Cullu, Queen of Connacht, fl. late 7th century. 
 Cacht ingen Cellaig, Queen of Ailech, fl. late 7th century
 Cacht ingen Ragnaill, Queen of Munster or Queen of Ireland, married 1032, died 1054.
 Cacht Ni Morda, Queen of Ui Muirdeagh, fl. 1114.
 Cacht Bean Ui Raighilligh, died 1231.

See also
List of Irish-language given names

External links
 http://medievalscotland.org/kmo/AnnalsIndex/Feminine/BenMuman.shtml

Irish-language feminine given names